The tertium quids (sometimes shortened to quids) were various factions of the Jeffersonian Republican Party in the United States from 1804 to 1812.

In Latin, tertium quid means "a third something". Initially, quid was a disparaging term that referred to cross-party coalitions of Federalists and moderate Republicans, such as those who supported the election of Thomas McKean as governor of Pennsylvania in 1805. However, by the 1810s, the term would more famously be used to refer to the radical faction of the Republican Party. The group, which was also called the Old Republicans, was more strongly opposed to the Federalist Party's policies than was the emerging moderate leadership of the Republican Party.

Pennsylvania 
Between 1801 and 1806, rival factions of Jeffersonian Republicans in Philadelphia, Pennsylvania, engaged in intense public debate and vigorous political competition, which pitted radical Democrats against moderate ones, who defended the traditional rights of the propertied classes. The radicals, led by William Duane, the publisher of the Jeffersonian Aurora, agitated for legislative reforms that would increase popular representation and the power of the poor and the laboring classes. The moderates successfully outmaneuvered their opponents and kept the Pennsylvania legislature friendly to the emerging liberal capitalism.

The term "tertium quids" was first used in 1804 to refer to the moderates, especially a faction of the Republican Party that called itself the Society of Constitutional Republicans. The faction gathered Federalist support and in 1805 re-elected Governor Thomas McKean, who had been elected by a united Republican Party in 1802 but had broken with the party's majority wing.

New York State 
In New York State, the term was applied to the faction of the Republican Party that remained loyal to Governor Morgan Lewis after he had been repudiated by the party's majority, which was led by DeWitt Clinton.

The New York State and the Pennsylvania Quid factions had no connection with each other at the federal level, and both of them supported US President Thomas Jefferson.

Virginia 

When Virginia Representative John Randolph of Roanoke broke with Jefferson and James Madison in 1806, his faction was called the "Quids". Randolph was the leader of the Old Republican faction, which insisted on strict adherence to the US Constitution. He summarized Old Republican principles as "love of peace, hatred of offensive war, jealousy of the state governments toward the general government; a dread of standing armies; a loathing of public debts, taxes, and excises; tenderness for the liberty of the citizen; jealousy, Argus-eyed jealousy of the patronage of the President"

Randolph made no effort to align with either Quid faction in the states and made no effort to build a third party at the federal level. He supported James Monroe against Madison during the runup to the presidential election of 1808. However, the state Quids supported Madison and were led by Randolph, who had started as Jefferson's leader in the House but later became his most bitter enemy. Randolph denounced the compromise on the Yazoo Purchase in 1804 as totally corrupt. After Randolph failed to impeach a Supreme Court justice in 1805, he became embittered with Jefferson and Madison and complained: "Everything and everybody seem to be jumbled out of place, except a few men who are steeped in supine indifference, whilst meddling fools and designing knaves are governing the country." He refused to help fund Jefferson's secret purchase of Florida from Spain.

Increasingly, Randolph felt that Jefferson was adopting Federalist policies and betraying the true party spirit. In 1806, he wrote to an ally that "the Administration... favors federal principles, and, with the exception of a few great rival characters, federal men.... The old Republican party is already ruined, past redemption. New men and new maxims are the order of the day."

Randolph's increasingly-strident rhetoric limited his influence, and he was never able to build a coalition to stop Jefferson. However, many of his supporters lived on and, by 1824, had looked to Andrew Jackson to resurrect what they called "Old Republicanism".

See also 
 Agrarianism
 American gentry
 Anti-Federalism
 Classical liberalism
 Classical republicanism
 Democratic-Republican Party
 First Party System
 Jacksonian democracy
 Jeffersonian democracy

References 

 
  The standard history of the Randolph faction.

External links 
 Tertium Quids – Modern Virginia political advocacy organization

Political party factions in the United States
Conservatism in the United States
Centrism in the United States